Faintley Speaking is a 1954 mystery detective novel by the British writer Gladys Mitchell.  It is the twenty seventh in her long-running series featuring the psychoanalyst and amateur detective Mrs Bradley.

Synopsis
An overhead phone conversation from a Miss Faintley draws a struggling author into a mystery involving a parcel drop that leads to murder of Faintley, a seemingly respectable schoolteacher. Mrs Bradley investigates the case, involving a gang of smugglers, through her devoted secretary Laura who goes undercover.

References

Bibliography
 Klein, Kathleen Gregory. Great Women Mystery Writers: Classic to Contemporary. Greenwood Press, 1994.
 Reilly, John M. Twentieth Century Crime & Mystery Writers. Springer, 2015.

1954 British novels
Novels by Gladys Mitchell
British crime novels
Novels set in England
British detective novels
Michael Joseph books